The Deputy Governor of the Turks and Caicos Islands is a gubernatorial official who acts as Governor when the latter is absent from the territory.

The Deputy Governor must be a resident of the Turks and Caicos Islands. They are appointment by the Governor in pursuance of instructions formally given by the sovereign through the Foreign Secretary. The Deputy Governor holds office during His Majesty's pleasure.

Responsibilities 

In addition to acting in place of the Governor when needed, the Deputy Governor has a wide portfolio of other responsibilities within the Government of the Turks and Caicos Islands. As of 2022, this extends to:

 Heading the public service
 Being the line manager of the Permanent Secretaries
 Chairing a Permanent Secretaries’ committee that reviews legislation and decisions for Cabinet.

In addition, the Deputy Governor’s office has direct responsibility for:

 The Human Resources Management Division of the Government
 Democratic Services
 House of Assembly
 Directorate Services
 Contracts & Corporate Performance Management
 The government’s Press Office

Office-holders

References 

Politics of the Turks and Caicos Islands